Heliotropium socotranum is a species of plant in the family Boraginaceae. It is endemic to the island of Socotra.  Its natural habitats are subtropical or tropical dry forests and subtropical or tropical dry shrubland.

References

Endemic flora of Socotra
socotranum
Least concern plants
Taxonomy articles created by Polbot